Sarah Brown is an English food writer and television cook. She presented the first vegetarian cookery show on British television.

Sarah Brown opened a whole food shop in Scarborough in 1978. Two years later this evolved into a vegetarian restaurant. She appeared several times on Yorkshire Television's Farmhouse Kitchen. In 1984 her successful series Vegetarian Kitchen was broadcast on BBC Two. Her book of the same name was reprinted eight times.
She served as the national coordinator of cookery for the Vegetarian Society.

Books
 Sarah Brown's Vegetarian Kitchen. (1984) BBC Books. 
 Sarah Brown's Vegetarian Cookbook. (1984) Dorling Kindersley Limited. ISBN 0-86318-042-6
 Sarah Brown's Vegetarian Microwave Cookbook. (1987) Dorling Kindersley Publishers Ltd.  
 Sarah Brown's Quick and Easy Vegetarian Cookery. (1989) BBC Books. 
 Sarah Brown's Healthy Pregnancy, a Vegetarian Approach. (1992) BBC Books.

External links 
Vegetarian Kitchen, BBC Video

Clip of Vegetarian Kitchen

IMDB listing for Vegetarian Kitchen

References

Women cookbook writers
People from Scarborough, North Yorkshire